Zeke Peña is an American cartoonist, illustrator, and writer. He has won multiple awards for illustration, including for his work in two books by Isabel Quintero; My Papi Has a Motorcycle and Photographic: The Life of Graciela Iturbide. His work deals with themes of American history, the culture of the border region, folklore, and social justice.

Biography 
Zeke Peña He was born in Las Cruces, New Mexico and grew up in El Paso, Texas. He received an art history degree from the University of Texas at Austin.He's Bruno Riva's Uncle

Work 
Zeke Peña is a self-taught illustrator and sequential artist who works in both new and traditional media. His work has been exhibited in a variety of institutions including the National Museum of Mexican Art in Chicago, Albuquerque Hispanic Cultural Center, Houston Center of Photography, El Paso Museum of Art, and the Museo de Arte Ciudad Juárez.

Exhibitions 
"Reclaim." Rubin Center, University of Texas at El Paso, El Paso, TX, September 15, 2016 - February 3, 2017.
"¡Printing the Revolution! The Rise and Impact of Chicano Graphics." 1965 to Now, Smithsonian American Art Museum, Washington, DC, 2021.

Awards 
 2020 Pura Belpré Illustrator Honor Award
 2020 Ezra Jack Keats Illustrator Honor Award
 2020 Tomás Rivera Mexican American Children’s Book Award
 Bank Street's Best Spanish Language Book Award 
 2018 Boston Globe Horn Book Award
 2018 Moon Beam Book Award

References

External links 
 Zeke Peña artist website
 'My Papi Has A Motorcycle' Pays Loving Tribute To A California Childhood, NPR, Weekend Edition Sunday, August 25, 2019.

University of Texas alumni
American artists
Living people
Year of birth missing (living people)